Brandon Johnson (born July 26, 1998) is an American football wide receiver for the Denver Broncos of the National Football League (NFL). He played college football at UCF.

Early years
Johnson attended and played high school football at American Heritage School.

College career

Tennessee
Johnson started his collegiate career at the University of Tennessee. He played there from 2016–2020 under head coaches Butch Jones and Jeremy Pruitt. He totaled 79 receptions for 969 receiving yards and one receiving touchdown to go along with a punt return touchdown in his time as a Volunteer.

UCF
Johnson transferred to UCF for the 2021 season. He totaled 38 receptions for 565 receiving yards and a team-leading 11 receiving touchdowns.

Professional career
On April 30, the Denver Broncos signed Johnson as an undrafted free agent.  On August 30, Johnson was waived with an injury settlement after suffering an ankle sprain.  On October 18, Johnson signed to the broncos practice squad.  On November 19, Johnson was elevated to the active roster.  On November 20, Johnson made his NFL debut against the Las Vegas Raiders totalling one reception for two yards in the 22–16 loss. On November 21, Johnson was reverted back to the practice squad.  On November 26, Johnson was elevated to the active roster.  In Week 12, against the Carolina Panthers, he scored his first NFL touchdown on a one-yard reception in the 23–10 loss. In his rookie season, Johnson appeared in seven games and recorded six receptions for 42 receiving yards and one touchdown.

Personal life
His father, Charles Johnson, played in Major League Baseball.

References

External links

Denver Broncos bio
UCF Knights bio
Tennessee Volunteers bio

1998 births
Living people
Players of American football from Fort Lauderdale, Florida
American football wide receivers
Tennessee Volunteers football players
UCF Knights football players
Denver Broncos players